Dabi may refer to:

People
  (born 1969), French political analyst; see 2019 European Parliament election in France
 Mohammed Ahmed Mustafa al-Dabi (born 1948), Sudanese military commander
 Snehal Dabi (born 1977), Indian actor

Other
 Dabi, India
 Dabi language
 Dabi, a character in My Hero Academia

See also
 Dąbie (disambiguation)